Mor Harchol-Balter is the Bruce J. Nelson Professor of Computer Science at Carnegie Mellon University.  She is known for her work on queueing theory, scheduling and resource allocation, load balancing, data center power management, and heavy-tailed workloads.

Academic biography
Harchol-Balter completed her PhD in 1996 at University of California, Berkeley, under the direction of Manuel Blum. From 1997 to 1999, she was supported by the NSF Postdoctoral Fellowship in the Mathematical Sciences at MIT, under the direction of Tom Leighton. Since 1999, Harchol-Balter has been a professor at CMU in the Computer Science Department.

Research
Harchol-Balter's research focuses on designing new resource allocation policies, including load balancing policies, scheduling policies, and power management policies, for multi-server, distributed systems.  She is the author of a popular textbook, Performance Analysis and Design of Computer Systems, published by Cambridge University Press, which bridges Operations Research and Computer Science.

Harchol-Balter has a long list of accomplished PhD students who include: Adam Wierman, Bianca Schroeder, Takayuki Osogami, David McWherter, Varun Gupta, Anshul Gandhi, Sherwin Doroudi, Timothy Zhu, Kristy Gardner, Ziv Scully, Benjamin Berg, and Isaac Grosof.

Awards and honors
Harchol-Balter is the recipient of an endowed chair. She is a Fellow of the ACM and a Fellow of IEEE.   She is heavily involved in the SIGMETRICS / PERFORMANCE research community, where she has received many paper awards, including: SIGMETRICS '19, PERFORMANCE '18, INFORMS APS '18, EUROSYS '16, MASCOTS '16, MICRO '10, SIGMETRICS '03, SIGMETRICS '96.  She collaborates heavily with industry and is a recipient of dozens of Industrial Faculty Awards including multiple awards from Google, Microsoft, IBM, EMC, Facebook, and Intel. She has won numerous teaching awards, including the Herbert A. Simon Award for Teaching Excellence (2003), the Ruth and Joel Spira Outstanding Teaching Award (2019), and the Teaching Effectiveness Award (1994).

References
Isaac Grosof, Ziv Scully, Mor Harchol-Balter. ``Load Balancing Guardrails: Keeping Your Heavy Traffic on the Road to Low Response Times." Volume 3, Issue 2, Article 42 (June 2019), pp. 42:1-- 42:31, June 2019, Phoenix, AZ. Best Student Paper Award.
Isaac Grosof, Ziv Scully, Mor Harchol-Balter. ``SRPT for Multiserver Systems.'' , vol. 127-128, Nov. 2018, pp. 154-175. Also appeared in the following conference: , Toulouse, France, December 2018. Best Student Paper Award.
Ziv Scully, Mor Harchol-Balter, Alan Scheller-Wolf. ``SOAP: One Clean Analysis of All Age-Based Scheduling Policies." vol. 2, no. 1, pp. 16:1 -- 16:30, March 2018, Los Angeles, CA. APS Best Student Paper Award Finalist.
Kristen Gardner, Mor Harchol-Balter, Alan Scheller-Wolf. ``A Better Model for Job Redundancy: Decoupling Server Slowdown and Job Size." . London, UK, September 2016, pp. 1–10. First runner-up for Best Paper Award.
Alexey Tumanov, Timothy Zhu, Jun Woo Park, Michael A. Kozuch, Mor Harchol-Balter, Gregory R. Ganger. ``TetriSched: Optimistic Global Continuous Rescheduling in Dynamic Heterogeneous Clusters." , London, UK, April 2016. Winner of EuroSys Best Student Paper Award.
Yoongu Kim, Michael Papamichael, Onur Mutlu, and Mor Harchol-Balter. "Thread Cluster Memory Scheduling: Exploiting Differences in Memory Access Behavior." , Atlanta, Georgia, December 2010, pp. 65–76.  Selected as IEEE Micro Top Picks 2010 paper for, vol. 31, no. 1, January/February 2011, pp. 78–89.
Bianca Schroeder and Mor Harchol-Balter. "Web servers under overload: How scheduling can help." . Berlin, Germany. September 2003, pp. 171–180. Winner of ITC Best Student Paper Award.
Adam Wierman and Mor Harchol-Balter. "Classifying Scheduling Policies with respect to Unfairness in an M/GI/1." , San Diego, CA. June 2003, pp. 238–249. Winner of SIGMETRICS Best Student Paper Award.
Mor Harchol-Balter and Allen Downey. "Exploiting Process Lifetime Distributions for Dynamic Load Balancing,"  May 23–26, 1996, Philadelphia, PA, pages 13–24. Winner of SIGMETRICS Best Paper Award for Integrating Systems and Theory.

External links
Home page

Living people
American computer scientists
American women computer scientists
Brandeis University alumni
University of California, Berkeley alumni
Carnegie Mellon University faculty
Fellows of the Association for Computing Machinery
People from South Brunswick, New Jersey
South Brunswick High School (New Jersey) alumni
1966 births